Solanum perlongistylum is an evergreen vine in the family Solanaceae. It is endemic to Peru, and is a close relative of S. muricatum, the domesticated pepino. Its style is the longest in the group, and its flowers have a higher pollen:ovule ratio. It is self-incompatible. It is diploid at n  =  12. Together with Solanum catilliflorum, it might be an allopatric variant of S. caripense.

References

perlongistylum
Flora of Peru